Birkby may refer to the following places in England:

Birkby, Cumbria
Birkby, North Yorkshire
Birkby, Huddersfield, West Yorkshire